Tragosoma is a genus of beetles in the longhorn beetle family, Cerambycidae.

Species
These species belong to the genus Tragosoma:
 Tragosoma depsarium (Linnaeus, 1767) i c g
 Tragosoma harrisii LeConte, 1851 c g b
 Tragosoma nigripenne Bates, 1892 c g
 Tragosoma pilosicorne Casey, 1890 i g b
 Tragosoma spiculum Casey, 1890 i c g b
 Tragosoma soror Laplante, 2017 i c g b
Data sources: i = ITIS, c = Catalogue of Life, g = GBIF, b = Bugguide.net

References

Further reading

Ray, A. M., et al. (2012). 2,3-hexanediols as sex attractants and a female-produced sex pheromone for cerambycid beetles in the prionine genus Tragosoma. J Chem Ecol 38(9) 1151–58.

Prioninae